This is a list of the more notable companies that manufactured traction engines of any kind, including steam tractors, portable engines, and steam rollers.

Germany
 Borsig of Berlin, Germany
 Esterer, Germany (particularly known for their Ploughing engines)
 Hanomag, Hannover, Germany now part of Komatsu
 Henschel & Son, of Kassel, Germany
 Kemna Bau, Breslau, (then) Germany
 Heinrich Lanz AG, of Mannheim, Germany
 , Wellentrup, Germany
 , Magdeburg, Germany
 , Stadthalle Soest, Germany
 Scharer & Gross, Germany
 , Germany

Great Britain
There were a large number of manufacturers in Great Britain.  Most started life as agricultural engineers, and many exported engines all over the world.  Some of the manufacturers are listed below:

William Allchin Ltd, Northampton – (MERL database entry)
John Allen & Co., Oxford - best Known for the Allen Scythe.
Aveling & Porter, Rochester, Kent
Bristol Wagon & Carriage Works Ltd Built steam wagons from 1904 to 1908
Brown & May, Devizes, Wiltshire
Charles Burrell & Sons, Thetford, Norfolk – (MERL database entry)
Clayton & Shuttleworth, Lincoln – (MERL database entry)
Edwin Foden, Sons & Co., Sandbach, Cheshire
William Foster & Co Ltd, Lincoln
G J Fowell & Co, St Ives, Huntingdonshire
John Fowler & Co., Leeds, Yorkshire
Gibbons & Robinson
Thomas Green & Son, Leeds, Yorkshire.
James & Frederick Howard, Bedford
Mann's Patent Steam Cart and Wagon Company, Leeds, Yorkshire
Marshall, Sons & Co., Gainsborough, Lincolnshire
J&H McLaren & Co., Leeds, Yorkshire
Paxman, Colchester, Suffolk
Ransomes, Sims & Jefferies Ltd, Ipswich, Suffolk
Richard Garrett & Sons, Leiston, Suffolk
Robey & Co, Lincoln – (MERL database entry)
Ruston & Hornsby Ltd, Lincoln
F Savage, King's Lynn, Norfolk - Portable centre engines for amusement rides
Sentinel Waggon Works, Shrewsbury, Shropshire - Utilised vertical boilers
Tasker & Sons, Andover, Hampshire
William Tuxford & Sons, Boston, Lincolnshire.
Wallis & Steevens, Basingstoke, Hampshire – (MERL database entry)
Yorkshire Patent Steam Wagon Co. Leeds, Yorkshire

North America
Key: '~' indicates a manufacturer for whom no known products survive.

Advance Thresher Co. – later merged with the M. Rumely Co. to create Advance-Rumely Thresher Co.
Advance-Rumely Thresher Co., La Porte, Indiana 
~Althaus Ewing & Co.
~American Engine Co.
American-Abell Engine and Thresher Company, Toronto, Ontario
 Amongst other models, built three-wheelers with a single wheel mounted on a fork perch bracket beneath the smokebox.
Ames Iron Works
~Atlas Engine Works
Aultman Co.
Aultman-Taylor Machinery Co.
Avery Power Machinery Co., Peoria, Illinois 
A.D. Baker Company
Best Manufacturing Company, San Leandro, California
Birdsall Engine Co.
Blumentritt Co.
Buffalo-Pitts Steam Roller Co.
Buffalo-Springfield Roller Co.
~Byron, Jackson Machine Works
Case, J.I. Co.
Colean Mfg. Co.
C & G Cooper & Co's.
Crowel Mfg. Co.
Clyde Iron Works Co., Duluth, MN
D. June & Co.
~Davidson & Rutledge
Farquhar, A.B. Co.
~Fishkill Landing Machine Co.
Frick & Co.
Gaar Scott & Co.
Geiser Manufacturing, makers of the Peerless line of steam tractors, later bought out by Emerson-Brantingham
~George W. Morris
~George Page & Co.
George White & Sons Co. Ltd., London and Brandon, Canada. 
Greyhound, Banting Mfg. Co.
Groton, Charles Perrige & Co.
~Hagerstown Steam Engine & Machine Co.
~Harrisburg Car Mfg. Co.
Harrison Machine Works (Jumbo)
Heilman Machine Works
~Holt Manufacturing Company (became Caterpillar Inc.)
~Hooven, Owens & Rentschler Co.
Huber Manufacturing Co.
Illinois Thresher Co.
~Jacob Price
~James Means & Co.
John Goodison Thresher Co. Ltd., Sarnia, Ontario, Canada
~J.M. Ross & Sons, St. Catherines, Ontario, Canada.
Keck-Gonnerman Co., Mount Vernon, Indiana
O.S. Kelly Co., Springfield, Ohio
Kitten, Ferdinand Foundry Co.
~Koppes W.M. & Co.
Lang & Button Co., Ithaca, New York
Lansing Iron Works Co. Lansing, Michigan 
Leader, Marion Mfg. Co., Marion, Ohio
MacDonald Thresher Co., Stratford, Ontario, Canada
McNamer Co., Newark, Ohio
~Merritt & Kellogg, Battle Creek, Michigan
~Messinger Mfg. Co., Tatamy, Pennsylvania
Minneapolis Threshing Machine Co., Hopkins, Minn.
~Morningstar Mfg. Co. (Napoleon), Napoleon, Ohio
~Muncy Traction Engine Co., Muncy, Pennsylvania
New-Giant, Northwest Thresher Co., Stillwater, Minn.
New Hamburg Mfg. Co. Ltd., New Hamburg, Ontario, Canada
Nichols & Shepard Co., Battle Creek, Michigan
~Ohio Engine & Thresher Co., Upper Sandusky, Ohio
~Owens, Lane & Duyer Co., Hamilton, Ohio
Peerless, Geiser Mfg. Co., Waynesboro, Pennsylvania
Peterson N. C. & Sons, Sarnia, Ontario, Canada
Port Huron Engine & Thresher Co., Port Huron, Mich.
Reeves & Co., Columbus, Indiana
~Remington Co., Woodburn, Oregon
Robert-Bell Engine & Thresher Co., Seaforth, Ontario, Canada
~Roberts & Dean Co., Sacramento, California
Robinson & Co., Richmond, Indiana
M Rumley Co., LaPorte, Indiana  – later merged with the Advance Thresher Co. to create Advance-Rumely Thresher Co.
 Russell & Company (Steam Tractor), Massillon, Ohio (1848-1962)
~Ryan & McDonald, Waterloo, New York
Sawyer-Massey & Co. Ltd., Hamilton, Ontario, Canada after merger with Harris to form Massey-Harris later became Massey Ferguson
Scheidler, R. Co., Newark, Ohio
Springfield Engine & Thresher Co., Springfield, Ohio (later became OS Kelly Co and Kelly Springfield)
Stevens, A. W. & Son Co., Auburn, New York
Stevens, A. W. Co., Marinette, Wisconsin
Twentieth Century Mfg. Co., Marinette, Wisconsin
~Union-Iron Works (Walker), Newark, Ohio
Upton Mfg. Co., Port Huron, Michigan
Waterloo Mfg. Co. Ltd., Waterloo, Ontario, Canada
Waterous Engine Works Co. Ltd., Bradford, Ontario, Canada
Watertown Engine Company, Watertown, New York
Westinghouse Co., Schenectady, New York Westinghouse Farm Engine
Wood Brothers Thresher Co., Des Moines, Iowa
Wood, S.W. & Son Co., Clyde, New York
Wood, Taber & Morse Co., Eaton, New York

Rest of the world
 Aillot, France
 Munktells Mekaniska Verkstad, Sweden (not Bolinders), now part of Volvo group
 , Denmark now part of Babcock & Wilcox

See also
 List of tractor manufacturers
 List of former tractor manufacturers
 List of tractors built by other companies
 List of steam energy topics
 List of steam car makers

References

 Traction engines
Traction Engines